Barry Neufeld was a school trustee in Chilliwack, BC. Neufeld was elected in December 1993 with his first term ending in December 2008. He was re-elected in December 2011. Neufeld has been criticized for making bigoted and discriminatory remarks towards the LGBTQ+ community, and in May 2020, he was accused of disparaging the Chief Public Health Officer of Canada Dr. Theresa Tam.

Neufeld first made headlines in 2017 for comparing gender transitioning to child abuse. His comments attracted widespread media attention, a court filing by the Canadian Union of Public Employees, and a vocal exchange with political and human rights defender Morgane Oger.
 The superintendent of School District 33 Chilliwack, Evelyn Novak, responded saying Neufeld did not speak for the Board on that issue.

The Chilliwack School Teachers Association passed a vote of non-confidence in 2017. The Chilliwack Board of Education passed a motion asking Neufeld to resign and the Ministry of Education issued a statement. Despite this, Neufeld has yet to resign.

In 2019, Neufeld's defamation lawsuit against British Columbia Teachers' Federation (BCTF) president Glen Hansman was dismissed in British Columbia’s first use of 'anti-SLAPP' (Strategic lawsuit against public participation) legislation.

Neufeld has complained other trustees treated him "like a dirty old man".

Neufeld lost his bid for re-election in October 2022.

References 

Living people
People from Chilliwack
British Columbia school board members
Year of birth missing (living people)